Alderfer is a surname. Notable people with the surname include:

Clayton Alderfer (1940–2015) American psychologist and consultant 
Elizabeth Alderfer (born 1986), American actress
Gertrude Alderfer (1931–2018), American baseball player

Surnames of German origin